Bicchugatti: Chapter 1 − Dalvayi Dange is a 2020 Indian Kannada language historical-period film  directed by Hari Santhosh, produced by Om Sai Krishna under his own banner Om Sai Krishna Productions. The film, starring  Rajavardhan and Hariprriya is an adaptation of novel Bichhugathi Baramanna Nayaka by  Dr. B.L Venu's, based on the Palegaras of Chitradurga.  The film also features Kalyanee Raju Sparsha Rekha and Prabhakar of Bahubali fame in the supporting cast. The music for the film is scored by Hamsalekha and Nakul Abhyankar. The cinematography is done by Guru Prasanth Raj.

The film was released on 28 February 2020.

Cast 
 Rajavardan as Brahamanna Nayaka
 Hariprriya as Siddhambe
 Prabhakar as Dalawayi Muddanna
 Sharath Lohitashwa as Obanna Nayaka
 Kalyanee Raju as Mallava
 Sparsha Rekha as Kanakava Nagathi

Production 
The film is produced by Om Sai Krishna. The film had a muhurtha on 10 December 2018 at Rockline Studios. Darshan was invited as the guest to launch the film. The movie first had Rajvardhan, who is debuting as a lead actor through this movie, on board. Later, Hariprriya was on board as the lead actress for the film. Hamsalekha was on board for scoring the music for the film after a long time. After the launch of the first look, the team got more appreciation seeking this they are planning to release the film in other South Indian languages like Tamil, Telugu, Malayalam and Hindi The film was wrapped up by 30 April 2019. The lead actors  had completed their portions of dubbing by 9 September 2019.

Music
The film's soundtracks were composed by  Nakul Abhyankar and lyrics by V. Nagendra Prasad. The music rights were acquired by OSK Productions.

Release 
The film was released on 28 February 2020.

Reception 
Before the release, the film team got appreciation from director S.S. Rajamouli seeing the few stills of the film.

References

External links 
 

Indian historical action films
Films shot in Mysore
Films shot in Bangalore
2020 films
2020s Kannada-language films
2020s historical action films
2020 action films
Films directed by Hari Santhosh